The 2004–05 Turkish Ice Hockey Super League season was the 13th season of the Turkish Ice Hockey Super League, the top level of ice hockey in Turkey. Ten teams participated in the league.

Regular season

Playoffs

Semifinals 
 Anka Spor Kulübü - İzmit Büyüksehir BSK 4:11
 Polis Akademisi ve Koleji - İstanbul Paten Spor Kulübü 8:4

3rd place
 Anka Spor Kulübü - İstanbul Paten Spor Kulübü 5:8

Final 
 Polis Akademisi ve Koleji - İzmit Büyüksehir BSK 7:3

External links
 Season on hockeyarchives.info

TBHSL
Turkish Ice Hockey Super League seasons
TBSHL